Goochan  is  Wizard's 7th studio album, released on 26 January 2007 by Massacre Records. A concept album with an ownwritten story. The story is said to be about the witch Goochan, who will try to save mother earth from armies from another planet (led by the "Pale Rider"), which tries to take over this planet. The story is also planned to be released as a book.

Songs
All songs written & arranged by Wizard
All lyrics written by Volker Leson

"The Witch of the Enchanted Forest" - 6:17
"Pale Rider" - 7:15
"Call to the Dragon" - 4:45
"Children of the Night" - 5:32
"Black Worms" - 4:00
"Lonely in Desert Land" - 5:52
"Dragon's Death" - 6:21
"Sword of Vengeance" - 4:05
"Two Faces of Balthasar" - 5:20
"Return of the Thunderwarriors" - 4:58

Personnel
 Sven D'Anna – vocals  
 Dano Boland – Guitar  
 Volker Leson – Bass  
 Sören van Heek – drums

External links 
 Goochan at Massacre Records
 

2007 albums
Wizard (German band) albums
Massacre Records albums
Concept albums